Peter Henry Rolfs (1865–1944) was a prominent Florida agronomist in the early 20th century.  He directed the Florida Agriculture Experiment Station from 1905 to 1920, and from 1915 to 1920 served as the Dean of the College of Agriculture at the University of Florida.  Rolfs then moved to Brazil to found the Escola Superior de Agricultura e Veterinária  in Viçosa, Minas Gerais, renamed to Universidade Federal de Viçosa.

Rolfs was the first to describe a common plant pathogen called Southern Blight, or Sclerotium rolfsii.

External links
Biography in Portuguese at the UFV website.
Peter Henry Rolfs collection at the University of Florida
Peter Henry Rolfs Digital Collection with full, open access to archival materials held at the University of Florida

American agronomists
Brazilian academics
University of Florida faculty
Brazilian people of German descent
1865 births
1944 deaths
Federal University of Viçosa